The  (Supreme President) was the highest administrative official in the Prussian provinces.

History
The Oberpräsident of a Prussian province was the supreme representative of the Prussian crown, until its downfall in 1918, in the province. In the 17th and 18th centuries he was appointed by the prince-electors or by the King and answered only to him.

From 1808 and 1815, the Oberpräsident on behalf of the king exercised the right of inspection, the supreme supervision of the administration in his province. He was, however, not in-charge of the district president, who was directly subordinate to the Prussian Ministry of the Interior in Berlin. The Oberpräsident had the right to be informed by the district presidents about all aspects of the province, he could take in all administrative procedures insight and was allowed to intervene in case of problems.

The position was maintained when the Prussian monarchy was dissolved, and the Free State of Prussia took its place in the Weimar Republic.

Under the Third Reich, the powers of the Oberpräsident were extended. They then were also responsible for Reich interests, similar to the powers of a Reichsstatthalter.

Prussia
 O